Martin John Callanan, Baron Callanan (born 8 August 1961) is a British Conservative Party politician. He was Member of the European Parliament (MEP) for North East England from 1999 to 2014 and Chairman of the European Conservatives and Reformists group from 2011 to 2014. Callanan failed his bid to win re-election in the 2014 European Parliament elections, becoming the first sitting chairman of a European parliamentary group to lose his seat. On 8 August 2014, it was announced that he would be made a Conservative life peer in the House of Lords.

Following the 2017 general election, Callanan was appointed Parliamentary Under-Secretary of State for Transport. In October the same year, he was appointed Minister of State for Exiting the European Union.

Early life
Callanan was born on 8 August 1961 in Gateshead. In 1985, he graduated with a Bachelor of Science degree (BSc) in Electrical and Electronic Engineering from Newcastle Polytechnic. He worked as an engineer at Scottish and Newcastle breweries from 1986 to 1998.

Political career

Local councillor
Callanan was a Conservative councillor on Tyne and Wear County Council between 1983 and 1986 (when the council was abolished) and Gateshead Metropolitan Borough Council between 1987 and 1996, for the Low Fell ward. He worked as a project engineer at Scottish and Newcastle breweries from 1986 to 1998, when he was elected to the European Parliament.

He unsuccessfully stood as a parliamentary candidate for Washington (in the 1987 election), Gateshead East (in the 1992 election), and Tynemouth (in the 1997 election).

Member of European Parliament
He was a Member of the European Parliament for the North East England constituency from 1999, re-elected in 2004 and 2009. In December 2011, he became the leader of the European Conservatives and Reformists group in the Parliament; as a leader of a parliamentary group, he had a seat in the political leadership of the European Parliament, the Conference of Presidents.

He was a member of the ACP–EU Joint Parliamentary Assembly, and of the European Parliament's committee on the environment, public health and food safety (ENVI). Callanan was a regular contributor to ConservativeHome, writing a monthly report.

Callanan failed to win re-election in the 2014 European Parliament election, becoming the first sitting chairman of a European parliamentary group to lose his seat.

Peer and government minister 
Callanan was created a life peer on 24 September 2014, taking the title Baron Callanan, of Low Fell in the County of Tyne and Wear.

Following the 2017 general election, Callanan was appointed Parliamentary Under-Secretary of State for Transport. In the role he introduced the Space Industry Bill.

In October the same year he was appointed Minister of State for Exiting the European Union. The following month he was obliged to apologise for incorrectly stating in the Lords that the Supreme Court had ruled Article 50 of the Treaty on European Union was irreversible.

Callanan was appointed Parliamentary Under Secretary of State at the newly created Department for Energy Security and Net Zero, on 7 February 2023, following a Cabinet reshuffle.

Notes

References

External links 
 Profile on European Parliament website
 

|-

1961 births
Alumni of Northumbria University
Conservative Party (UK) MEPs
Living people
MEPs for England 1999–2004
MEPs for England 2004–2009
MEPs for England 2009–2014
Conservative Party (UK) life peers
Conservative Party (UK) parliamentary candidates
Life peers created by Elizabeth II